Mriya, Ukrainian for 'dream', may refer to:

 Antonov An-225 Mriya, a cargo aircraft, destroyed during Russia's 2022 invasion of Ukraine
 Mriya, a Ukrainian bank bought up by Russia's VTB Bank